The 1995 Kazakhstan Cup is the fourth season of the Kazakhstan Cup, the annual nationwide football cup competition of Kazakhstan since the independence of the country. The competition begins on 9 May 1995, and will end with the final in November 1995. Vostok are the defending champions, having won their first cup in the 1994 competition.

First round

Quarter-finals

Semi-finals

Final

References

Kazakhstan Cup seasons
1995 domestic association football cups
Cup